MMSC may refer to:

 Multimedia Messaging Service
 Double Master of Science, an academic degree
 Methyl methionine sulfonium chloride
 Master of Medical Science, an academic degree
 Madras Motor Sports Club, an auto racing club in Chennai, India
 Mohammadpur Model School & College, Dhaka, Bangladesh
 Master of Metaphysical Science, a degree offered by the University of Metaphysics
 Multi-Mission Surface Combatant, an export variant of the Freedom-class littoral combat ship developed for the Royal Saudi Navy.